Valeriu Neagu (born 26 April 1930) was a Romanian footballer who played as a striker.

Playing career
While playing for Dinamo București Valeriu Neagu was used by coach Angelo Niculescu in 23 matches in which he scored 10 goals in the 1955 Divizia A season, helping the team win the first title in the club's history. He played in the 1954 Cupa României final which was lost by Dinamo with 2–0 in front of Metalul Reșița and played in the first European match of a Romanian team in the 1956–57 European Cup in the 3–1 victory against Galatasaray, helping The Red Dogs go to the next phase of the competition where they were eliminated by CDNA Sofia, against whom he scored a goal, having a total of three appearances in the campaign.

Valeriu Neagu played one friendly match for Romania, on 19 September 1954 when coach Ștefan Dobay sent him on the field in order to replace Stere Zeană in the 72nd minute of a 5–1 loss against Hungary.

Managerial career
While coaching Dinamo Bacău, Valeriu Neagu managed to lead the team to the 1969–70 Inter-Cities Fairs Cup quarter-finals where they were eliminated by Arsenal who would eventually win the competition. He went to coach in Turkey at Boluspor, Antalyaspor and Eskişehirspor, obtaining his biggest performance in Turkish football when he managed to qualify Boluspor in the 1974–75 UEFA Cup, where he got eliminated in the first round by his former team, Dinamo București.

Honours

Player
Dinamo București
Divizia A: 1955
Cupa României runner-up: 1954

Manager
Boluspor
Turkish Second Football League: 1985–86

References

External links
Valeriu Neagu's manager profile at Labtof.ro

1930 births
Possibly living people
Romanian footballers
Romania international footballers
Place of birth missing (living people)
Association football forwards
Liga I players
FC Petrolul Ploiești players
Unirea Tricolor București players
FC Dinamo București players
Romanian football managers
Romanian expatriate football managers
Expatriate football managers in Turkey
FCM Bacău managers
Boluspor managers
Antalyaspor managers
Eskişehirspor managers